Deh Chah (also Romanized as Deh Chāh and Deh-e Chāh) is a village in Deh Chah Rural District, Poshtkuh District, Neyriz County, Fars Province, Iran. At the 2006 census, its population was 2,123, in 554 families.

References 

Populated places in Neyriz County